Michael Joseph Baxter (born December 7, 1984) is an American former professional baseball outfielder. He played in Major League Baseball (MLB) for the San Diego Padres, New York Mets, Los Angeles Dodgers and Chicago Cubs.   He is now a hitting coach and recruiting coordinator for his alma Mater, Vanderbilt University.

Early years
Baxter was born and raised in the Queens, New York neighborhood of Whitestone, where he attended St. Luke's Parish school and part of the Bayside Little League. He graduated from Archbishop Molloy High School in 2002. Baxter attended Columbia University, and he then attended Vanderbilt University. In 2004 and 2005, he played collegiate summer baseball with the Hyannis Mets of the Cape Cod Baseball League. He was selected by the San Diego Padres in the fourth round (128th overall) of the 2005 amateur entry draft.

Professional career

San Diego Padres
Baxter's contract was purchased by the Padres and he was promoted to the major leagues on September 6, 2010 and hit a pop fly to second base off Vicente Padilla of the Los Angeles Dodgers in his first at-bat, as a pinch hitter. He appeared in 9 games that season, all as a pinch hitter, with his only hit being on September 26 off Francisco Cordero of the Cincinnati Reds.

New York Mets

2011
After being placed on the 60-day disabled list in March 2011, Baxter began his rehab in Single-A, before being claimed off waivers by the New York Mets on July 22. He was called up by New York on August 8. In his first game, he hit an RBI double against San Diego to bring the Mets closer to what would end up being a come-from-behind victory. On September 28, 2011, the final game of the Mets' season, Baxter hit his first career major league home run. It gave the Mets a 3–0 lead, and was the last home run and RBI of the season for the team. He was non tendered by the Mets after the season and became a free agent. On December 16, he re-signed a minor league contract with the Mets. He also received an invitation to spring training as part of the deal.

2012
In 2012, Baxter began the season on the Mets active roster as a reserve outfielder. On June 1, during a game against the St. Louis Cardinals, Baxter made a difficult catch against the outfield wall, injuring his shoulder in the process. He was subsequently placed on the team's disabled list on June 3. Despite the recoil, his big play led to Johan Santana's no-hitter, the first no-hitter in Mets' history. Baxter began a rehab assignment with the Single-A St. Lucie Mets on July 15, before being promoted to the Double-A Binghamton Mets and last to the Triple-A Buffalo Bisons. On July 30, Baxter was activated from the 15-day disabled list. On August 4, during a game against the San Diego Padres, Baxter set a New York Mets franchise record by recording five walks in a nine-inning game, tying the record for most walks in a nine-inning game in the National League; this was most recently achieved by Ryan Howard of the Philadelphia Phillies. Baxter also tied a New York Mets franchise record for most walks in a game, regardless of the number of innings played. He tied Vince Coleman, who achieved the feat on August 10, 1992, in a 16-inning game against the Pittsburgh Pirates.

2013
In 2013, Baxter was on the Mets' active roster for opening day for the second consecutive year. Despite being considered a front-runner for a starting outfield spot at the beginning of spring training, the starting job was instead given to Marlon Byrd, again relegating Baxter to a reserve role. In June, Baxter was sent down to the Triple-A Las Vegas 51s. On August 3, the Mets recalled Baxter to replace David Wright who was placed on the 15-day disabled list. Baxter was optioned down on August 24 when Lucas Duda was recalled. He was called back up on September 8.

Los Angeles Dodgers

On October 17, 2013, Baxter was claimed off waivers by the Los Angeles Dodgers. He made the opening day roster and appeared in 4 games and was hitless in 7 at-bats before he was optioned to the minors. He was designated for assignment on April 6, 2014, cleared waivers, and was outrighted to AAA Albuquerque, where he hit .289 in 119 games.

Chicago Cubs
Baxter signed a minor league contract with the Chicago Cubs in January 2015. He was assigned to the Cubs Triple-A Iowa team to start the season.

Baxter's contract was selected by the Cubs and he was called up on May 19, 2015, as part of a number of roster moves made by the Cubs that day. He would be optioned back down to Iowa on June 2 but recalled on June 3. On July 29, 2015, Baxter was designated for assignment by the Chicago Cubs.

Seattle Mariners
On December 15, 2015, Baxter signed a minor league deal with the Seattle Mariners. He became a free agent on November 7, 2016.

Post-baseball career
Baxter has served as a hitting coach and recruiting coordinator for the Vanderbilt Commodores baseball team at Vanderbilt University since 2018.

Awards and honors
 2008 Arizona Fall League All-Prospect Team

References

External links

1984 births
Living people
Albuquerque Isotopes players
Archbishop Molloy High School alumni
Baseball players from New York (state)
Buffalo Bisons (minor league) players
Binghamton Mets players
Chicago Cubs players
Columbia Lions baseball players
Columbia College (New York) alumni
Everett AquaSox players
Fort Wayne Wizards players
Hyannis Harbor Hawks players
Iowa Cubs players
Lake Elsinore Storm players
Las Vegas 51s players
Los Angeles Dodgers players
Major League Baseball outfielders
New York Mets players
People from Whitestone, Queens
Peoria Saguaros players
Portland Beavers players
San Antonio Missions players
San Diego Padres players
St. Lucie Mets players
Tacoma Rainiers players
Vanderbilt Commodores baseball coaches
Vanderbilt Commodores baseball players